The Hohwart (occasionally also Hohwarthöhe or Hohwart-Höhe) is a mountain near the village of Breitnau in the Black Forest in the German state of Baden-Württemberg. It is 1,123 metres high.

Wind generator 
On 26 May 1992 a wind generator was built on the Hohwart Saddle, not far from the summit of the Hohwart. It was one of the first wind turbines in Baden-Württemberg. It is an Enercon  type E-32/E-33 with a 3-blade rotor and a hub height of 33.5 m.

Schanze on the Hohwart 
On the Hohwart is a schanze. It was part of the baroque fortifications in the Black Forest. It was a square schanze in which there were log cabins. The schanze on the Hohwart was not linked by a bank-and-ditch system to its neighbouring schanzes, the Schanze auf dem Haldenbuck and the Ringelschanze on the Roßberg.

References 

Mountains and hills of the Black Forest
One-thousanders of Germany